The 2016–17 Serie A was the 50th season of the women's football top level league in Italy. ACF Brescia were the defending champions.

Fiorentina won the championship.

Standings

Relegation play-offs
Scheduled as 7th vs 10th, and 8th vs 9th place unless one team trails the other by more than seven points. Thus Cuneo remained in Serie A without the play-off and Chieti was relegated. The other match was won by Zaccaria 3–0 over Como.

Top scorers
.

References

External links
 Season on soccerway.com

2016-17
2016–17 domestic women's association football leagues
Women
1